Marta Baldó Marín (born 8 April 1979) is a Spanish rhythmic gymnast and Olympic Champion. She won a gold medal with the Spanish group at the 1996 Summer Olympics in Atlanta. The team was formed by Marta, Estela Giménez, Nuria Cabanillas, Lorena Guréndez, Estíbaliz Martínez and Tania Lamarca.  She has also won bronze, silver and gold metals at the rhythmic gymnastics World Championships, and silver and bronze metals at the European championships.

See also
 List of gymnasts
 List of Olympic medalists in gymnastics (women)
 Gymnastics at the Pan American Games
 World Rhythmic Gymnastics Championships
 Gymnastics at the World Games
 Rhythmic Gymnastics European Championships

References

External links

 
 
 
 

1979 births
Living people
Spanish rhythmic gymnasts
Olympic gold medalists for Spain
Gymnasts at the 1996 Summer Olympics
Olympic gymnasts of Spain
Olympic medalists in gymnastics
Medalists at the 1996 Summer Olympics
Sportspeople from Alicante